Grand Portage is an unincorporated community in Cook County, Minnesota, United States; located on Grand Portage Bay of the North Shore of Lake Superior.

Grand Portage is 34 miles northeast of the city of Grand Marais and five miles southwest of the Canada–United States border. Minnesota Highway 61 serves as a main route in the community.

The unincorporated community of Grand Portage and the Grand Portage Indian Reservation are both within Grand Portage Unorganized Territory of Cook County (population 565).

The Grand Portage National Monument is adjacent to the community. Grand Portage State Park is nearby on the banks of the Pigeon River.

Mount Josephine (elevation 1,315) is immediately northeast of Grand Portage (elevation 630).

History
In the 17th century, Grand Portage became a major center of the fur trade on the Canadian canoe routes. A major canoe fur trade route of the voyageurs left the Great Lakes there, which got its name from the fact that the route began with a nine-mile portage., where the canoes and equipment were carried over land. The French established this trade with the Native Americans until the British took it over in the 18th century after the Seven Years' War. The North West Company established the area as its regional headquarters. Grand Portage soon became one of Britain's four main fur trading posts, along with Niagara, Detroit, and Michilimackinac. Even after the American Revolutionary War and victory by the rebellious colonists, the British continued to operate in the area. Under the Treaty of Paris in 1783, Britain had to cede former territory to the United States, including this area.

Finally, with the signing of the Jay Treaty in 1796, defining the northern border between Canada and the US, British traders planned to move from Grand Portage since they wanted to avoid the taxes the US put on their operations, in its effort to encourage American traders instead. In 1802, the traders planned to move north to create a new center, what they called Fort William. In 1803, following the Louisiana Purchase, in which the US acquired the lands to the west of Grand Portage, the British finally moved from Grand Portage to the new post in Canada. The North West Company moved its headquarters northward to what they named Fort William. After British fur traders abandoned the area, it rapidly declined economically until fisheries and logging became popular in the 19th century.

Geography
The community of Grand Portage is 34 miles northeast of Grand Marais, six miles southwest of the Canada–US border, 146 miles northeast of Duluth and 43 miles southwest of Thunder Bay.

Grand Portage is the home of Grand Portage Lodge and Casino.

The island of Isle Royale in Lake Superior is located 15 miles east of the port of Grand Portage. The island and the 450 surrounding smaller islands make up Isle Royale National Park.  The island of Isle Royale is 45 miles long and nine miles wide. The Sea Hunter, Voyageur II, and Wenonah passenger ferries all run out of Grand Portage and travel to the port of Windigo, on the western end of Isle Royale. The ferries pass by Rock of Ages Lighthouse near Windigo. The Voyageur II passenger ferry also travels further to the port of Rock Harbor on the eastern end of Isle Royale. Scheduled toll ferry service from Grand Portage to Isle Royale runs from May to October.

Climate

Education
All of the county is zoned to Cook County ISD 166.

See also
 Grand Portage National Monument
 Grand Portage, Minnesota – Unorganized Territory of Cook County
 Grand Portage Indian Reservation

References

 Rand McNally Road Atlas – 2007 edition – Minnesota entry
 Official State of Minnesota Highway Map – 2011/2012 edition

Unincorporated communities in Minnesota
Unincorporated communities in Cook County, Minnesota
Minnesota populated places on Lake Superior